Denny Coffman is an American politician and former Democratic member of the Hawaii House of Representatives who represented District 5 until his resignation on December 20, 2013. Prior to reapportionment, Coffman served from 2008 until 2012 representing District 6.

Education
Coffman earned his associate degree in data processing and his bachelor's degree in business administration.

Elections
2012 Redistricted to District 5, and with Democratic Representative Bob Herkes running for Hawaii Senate, Coffman won the August 11, 2012 Democratic Primary with 2,462 votes (55.9%), and won the November 6, 2012 General election with 5,464 votes (63.2%) against Republican nominee Dave Bateman.
2010 Coffman was unopposed for the September 18, 2010 Democratic Primary, winning with 2,490 votes, and won the November 2, 2010 General election with 3,538 votes (49.8%) against Republican nominee Rebecca Leau.
2008 When Democratic Representative Josh Green ran for Hawaii Senate and left the District 6 seat open, Coffman won the three-way September 20, 2008 Democratic Primary with 1,426 votes (39.2%), and won the November 4, 2008 General election with 4,520 votes (47.6%) against Republican nominee Andy Smith.

References

External links
Official page at the Hawaii State Legislature
Campaign site
 

Place of birth missing (living people)
Year of birth missing (living people)
Living people
Democratic Party members of the Hawaii House of Representatives